Street Map is an EP of new studio recordings from the Innocence Mission. Limited to 5,000 copies, the release is their first since 2000's Christ Is My Hope to be sold though their website without the involvement of a record label.

Originally intended to preview their next studio LP, an update to their website in September 2009 revealed that after further recording, the next LP "turned out to be a mostly new group of songs, with maybe one song from Street Map." In March 2010, however, it was announced that no songs found on Street Map would appear on the upcoming album. My Room in the Trees was released in July.

The EP also contains one previously released recording. "A Thousand Miles" was originally available on the charity compilation Evensong in 2000. The track has been re-mastered for this release.

Track listing

Personnel
 Karen Peris: Vocals, Guitars, Field Pump Organ and Piano
 Don Peris: Guitars, Background Vocals and Drums
 Mike Bitts: Upright and Electric Bass

Album credits
 Recorded in Lancaster, Pennsylvania by Don Peris
 Engineered and Mixed by Don Peris

References

2008 EPs
The Innocence Mission albums